The Experimental Craft Hydrofoil No. 4 (XCH-4) was a high speed hydrofoil of the United States Navy. In 1947 the Bureau of Ships in association with the Office of Naval Research subsidised the construction of a number of small watercraft to explore several different types of foils and foil control-system configurations. The XCH-4 (sometimes referred to as "The Carl Boat") was designed by John H. Carl and built, in 1953, by Dynamic Developments Inc., a former associate of the Grumman Aircraft Engineering Corporation. 

The XCH-4 employed three struts with "ladder" type hydrofoils. The foils were swept back approximately 45 degrees and have considerable dihedral providing a very stable ride even in moderately rough seas. The design eliminated drag inducing water propeller drive systems in favor of aircraft type propellers powered by two Pratt & Whitney R-985 Wasp Junior radial engines and in 1955 the vessel set a world speed record 78 knots.

See also
HD-4
 , auxiliary minesweeper (1939–1940)
 , experimental hydrofoil (1957–1962)

References

Hydrofoils of the United States
1953 ships